Thomas Sparrow (born 31 May 2000) is a professional Australian rules footballer playing for the Melbourne Football Club in the Australian Football League (AFL). Growing up in the Adelaide Hills, Sparrow attended Scott Creek Primary and began his footballing career at Bridgewater Football Club. On 17 March 2022 Sparrow signed a two-year contract extension with Melbourne.

Statistics
Updated to the end of the 2022 season.

|-
| 2019 ||  || 32
| 2 || 1 || 0 || 17 || 5 || 22 || 2 || 8 || 0.5 || 1.0 || 8.5 || 2.5 || 11.0 || 1.0 || 4.0
|-
| 2020 ||  || 32
| 5 || 2 || 1 || 26 || 30 || 56 || 9 || 13 || 0.4 || 0.2 || 5.2 || 6.0 || 11.2 || 1.8 || 2.6
|-
| scope=row bgcolor=F0E68C | 2021# ||  || 32
| 21 || 7 || 4 || 102 || 84 || 186 || 40 || 57 || 0.3 || 0.2 || 4.9 || 4.0 || 8.9 || 1.9 || 2.7
|-
| 2022 ||  || 32
| 23 || 7 || 8 || 189 || 182 || 371 || 69 || 78 || 0.3 || 0.4 || 8.2 || 7.9 || 16.1 || 3.0 || 3.4
|- class=sortbottom
! colspan=3 | Career
! 51 !! 17 !! 15 !! 334 !! 301 !! 635 !! 120 !! 156 !! 0.3 !! 0.3 !! 6.5 !! 5.9 !! 12.5 !! 2.4 !! 3.4
|}

Notes

Honours and achievements
Team
 AFL premiership player: 2021
 McClelland Trophy: 2021

References

External links

2000 births
Living people
Melbourne Football Club players
South Adelaide Football Club players
Australian rules footballers from South Australia
Melbourne Football Club Premiership players
One-time VFL/AFL Premiership players